Susan Constant, possibly Sarah Constant, captained by Christopher Newport, was the largest of three ships of the English Virginia Company (the others being Discovery and Godspeed) on the 1606–1607 voyage that resulted in the founding of Jamestown in the new Colony of Virginia.

History
Susan Constant was rated at 120 tons.

On the 1606–1607 voyage, it carried 71 colonists, all male, including John Smith. On June 22, 1607, Christopher Newport sailed back for London with Susan Constant and Godspeed carrying a load of supposedly precious minerals, leaving behind the 104 colonists and Discovery (to be used in exploring the area).

Susan Constant, which had been a rental ship that had customarily been used as a freight transport, did not return to Virginia again. She later served as a merchant ship through at least 1615. Her fate is unknown.

Name
The alternative name Sarah Constant has been cited, and is shown as being the name noted on the earliest document, leading to a belief that Samuel Purchas had the name wrong in his Pilgrims book. There is growing support for the name Sarah Constant. The article that cites Sarah Constant, presumably written by Sir Walter Raleigh, is as follows:

Replica

Replicas of Susan Constant and her sisters, Godspeed and Discovery, are docked in the James River at Jamestown Settlement (formerly Jamestown Festival Park), adjacent to Historic Jamestown.

In popular culture
Susan Constant is depicted in the 1995 animated film Pocahontas, where its captain was Governor Ratcliffe (who actually captained Discovery), instead of Christopher Newport.

In May 2007, the United States Postal Service issued the first 41-cent denomination first-class stamp. The stamp had an image of Susan Constant, Godspeed, and Discovery. Susan Constant was also depicted on Virginia's coin of the 50 State Quarters, in celebration of the quincentennial of Jamestown.

See also
Ship replica (including a list of ship replicas)

References

Further reading

Lavery, Brian. (1988) The Colonial Merchantman Susan Constant 1605. London: Conway Maritime Press.
Price, David A. (2003) Love and Hate in Jamestown. New York: Alfred A. Knopf. (chapter 2)
Spectre, Peter H.; Larkin, David. (1991) Wooden Ship: The Art, History, and Revival of Wooden Boatbuilding. Boston: Houghton Mifflin. ("The Building of the Susan Constant", pp. 67–139)

Exploration ships of the United Kingdom
History of the Thirteen Colonies
Replica ships